Quarter midget racing is a form of automobile racing. The cars are approximately one-quarter (1/4) the size of a full-size midget car. The adult-size midget being raced during the start of quarter midget racing used an oval track of one-fifth of a mile in length.  The child's quarter midget track is one quarter that length, or 1/20 mile (264 feet).

An adult-size midget in the 1940s and 1980s could reach 120 miles per hour, while the single-cylinder 7-cubic-inch quarter midget engine could make available a speed of 30 miles per hour in a rookie class (called novices), or one-quarter the speed of the adult car. Most of the competitive classes run speeds near 45 miles per hour. Current upper-class quarter midgets can exceed 45 miles per hour, but remain safe due to the limited size of the track. Quarter midget racecars have four-wheel suspension, unlike go-karts.

The drivers are typically restricted to ages 5 to 16. Tracks are typically banked ovals one-twentieth of a mile long, and have surfaces of dirt, concrete, or asphalt.

Statistics

Quarter midgets have been around in one form or another since before World War II, There are three sanctioning bodies for quarter midgets, Quarter Midgets of America (QMA), the PowRi Quarter Midget Racing League and the United States Auto Club (USAC), with the USAC quarter-midget series now known as the NASCAR Youth Series.  There were over 4,000 quarter midget drivers in the United States in 2007. Many of today's most recognizable names in racing got their start in quarter midgets, including A. J. Foyt, Jeff Gordon, Sarah Fisher, Jimmy Vasser, Joey Logano, Brad Keselowski, Terry Labonte, and Bobby Labonte.

The oldest continually run dirt quarter midget track east of the Mississippi is the Hulman Mini Speedway, operated since 1958 by the Terre Haute Quarter Midget Association (THQMA) located in Terre Haute, Indiana. On the west coast, the Capitol Quarter Midget Association has operated a dirt track for quarter midgets since 1954. Jeff Gordon raced in the Capitol Quarter Midget Association

Quarter midget cars can be reasonably affordable or can cost nearly as much as some full-sized racing cars. Engines can cost from $400 to $8,000. Car chassis can cost from $1,500 (used) up to $6,000 (new). Tires start at $50 each. There are many brands of cars as well as custom cars made by individuals. Some of the common brands are Stanley Racing, N/C chassis (Nervo/Coggin), Talon Chassis, Bullrider Racecars, Tad Fiser Race Cars, Rice Cars, Ashley Chassis, Cobra Race Cars, Storm Chassis, GT American, and Afco race cars.  Cars are covered by body panels which are made of fiberglass, aluminum, or occasionally carbon fiber.

Engine costs have driven a number of changes over the years. As the cost of the Deco engine platform continued to rise, Honda engines were adopted. The move from Deco to Honda was first highlighted by an exhibition race at the 1988 Western Grands in Pueblo, Colorado. Attempts to put the Deco/Continental engines back into production failed. Later problems with Honda engine revisions and parts tolerances led to the adoption of Briggs & Stratton engines as a cost-effective engine platform.  This adoption has come in the form of both the World Formula and Briggs Animal engines. USAC started using Animal engines in 2010. QMA planned to introduce the Animal engine platform beginning in 2012 and begin phasing out the Honda platform altogether in 2013 but has not moved away from the Honda engine platform. USAC includes the Animal and Honda platforms. USAC has recently discarded all of the Deco platform and introduced the light and heavy modified World Formula for 2017.

Engines and classes

Red & Blue Rookie (USAC), Jr. Novice & Adv. Novice (QMA) - Honda 120 (stock, restricted)
Jr. Animal & Sr. Animal - Briggs & Stratton Animal engine (stock, restricted)
Hvy. Animal - Briggs & Stratton Animal engine (stock)
Jr. Honda - Honda 120 (stock, restricted)
Sr. Honda - Honda 120 (stock)
Hvy. Honda - Honda 120 (stock with Honda GX 160 carburetor)
Jr. Super Stock & Sr. Super Stock (QMA) -  Deco (stock, restricted)
Mod (QMA) - Deco (modified)
Jr. 160 - Honda 160 (QMA) (stock with Honda GX 120 carburetor)
Lt. 160 - Honda 160 (stock)
Hvy. 160 - Honda 160 (stock with Honda GX 200 carburetor)
B (QMA) - Deco (modified)
Modified World Formula (USAC) - Briggs and Stratton World Formula (modified, methanol)
AA/Modified World Formula (QMA) - Deco (modified, methanol), or Briggs and Stratton World Formula (modified, methanol)
Lt. & Hvy. World Formula - Briggs and Stratton World Formula (stock)
Junior classes are for drivers 5-8 years old, while senior classes are for drivers 9-16. Light classes are for drivers up to 100 lbs in normal street clothes. For heavy classes, drivers must be a minimum of 100 lbs.

Half midgets (QMA) 

Half Class – any single cylinder, 4-cycle, air-cooled, naturally aspirated, under 253 cc engine, drivers aged 11 to 18

QMA Grands champions

2017 Western Grands— 
Jr. Animal: Caleb Johnson
Sr. Animal: Cam Fiser
Hvy Animal: Tyler Conley 
Jr. Honda: Jayson Elf
Sr. Honda: Matthew Roberts
Hvy. Honda: Daytona Spicola
Jr. Stock: Destry Miller
Mod: Chase Spicola
Lt. 160: Cam Fiser
Hvy 160: Zack Medynski
B: Victoria Wolf
AA: Tyler Conley
Light World Formula: Cam Fiser
Heavy World Formula: Tyler Conley
Jr. Half: Andrew Link

2017 Eastern Grands— 
Jr. Honda: Caleb Johnson
Sr. Honda: Bradley Erickson
Hvy. Honda: Alex French
Jr. Animal: Collin Mitchell
Sr. Animal: Colby Sokol
Hvy. Animal: Kaylee Esgar
Mod: Chase Spicola
Lt. 160: Chase Spicola
Hvy 160: Alex French
AA: Bryce Lucius
Light World Formula: Chase Spicoloa
Heavy World Formula: Kaylee Esgar
Jr. Half: Taylor Nibert
Jr. Novice: Keegan Gasseling
Sr. Novice: Laken Hall

2016 Western Grands— 
Jr. Animal: Justis Sokol
Sr. Animal: Cam Fiser
Hvy Animal: Tyler Conley
Jr. Honda: Caleb Johnson
Sr. Honda: Matthew Roberts
Hvy. Honda: Krystal Faulkingham
Jr. Stock: Elvis Rankin
Mod: Bret Degand
Lt. 160: Matthew Roberts
Hvy 160: Kaylee Esgar
B: Victoria Wolf
AA: Tyler Conley
Light World Formula: Cam Fiser
Heavy World Formula: Tyler Conley
Jr. Novice: Mackenzie Rust
Sr. Novice: Anelen McMains

2016 Eastern Grands— 
Sr. Animal: Famous Rhodes II
Jr. Honda: Thomas Schwarz
Sr. Honda: Ryan Boyd
Jr. Animal: Jackson White
Hvy. Honda: Holt Halder
Lt. 160: Ryan Boyd
Hvy 160: Holt Halder
Light World Formula: Samantha Osborn
Heavy World Formula: Holt Halder
Jr. Half: Joshua Kunstbeck
Jr. Novice: Nicholas Leonard
Sr. Novice: Faith Reep

2005 Eastern Grands— Sr. Honda: Tyler Edwards Jr. Honda: Blaze Gerenda Hvy. Honda: David Swearinger Jr. Stock: Max McGhee Sr. Stock: Jeremy Doll Lt. Mod: Kyle Reinhardt Hvy. Mod: D.J. Wykes Lt. 160: Jamie Murray Hvy 160: Matthew McGillivray Light B: Austin Kochenash Heavy B: Jessie Harper Light A: Domenic Melair Hvy. A: D.J. Wykes Half A: Andy Nock

USAC National Championships
Jr. Honda:case james
Sr. Honda: Dylan Zampa
Hvy. Honda: Canon Cochran
Lt. 160: Emerson Axsom
Hvy 160: Levi Rifle
Jr. Animal: Gavin Boschele
Sr. Animal: Nick Loden
Unrestricted Animal: Scotty Milan 
Light Mod: Chase Burda
Light World Formula: Connor Gross
Heavy World Formula: Canon Cochran 
Light AA: Connor Gross
Modified World Formula: Emerson Axsom

References

External links
 Washington Quarter Midget Association
Little Wheels Quarter Midget Association
Baylands Quarter Midget Racing Club, San Jose, California
Tucson Quarter Midget Association (TQMA)Tucson, Arizona
The Caruso Racing Museum, Las Vegas, Nevada
Tucson Quarter Midget Association TQMA
Quarter/Half Midget Driver- Dalton Grindle #23
Quarter Midgets of America website
Western Australian Quarter Midget Association
a webpage documenting many facets of early QM racing
Racing Website with some history of QMA - Mitchell Family Racing, Featuring Angelique Mitchell 
North Carolina Quarter Midget Association
North Georgia Quarter Midget Association
Central Indiana Quarter Midget Association (Mini-Indy)
Kokomo Indiana Quarter Midget Club
USAC Point 25 Quarter Midgets
Silver City Quarter Midget Club, CT
Terre Haute Quarter Midget Association
Jenson Walker / USAC .25 Midget Driver from Michigan
I-5 Quarter Midget Club Elma, WA

Racing car classes
Midget car racing